The 1949 Estonian SSR Football Championship was won by Tallinna Dünamo.

League table

References

Estonian Football Championship
Football
Estonia